John Hopkinson, FRS, (27 July 1849 – 27 August 1898) was a British physicist, electrical engineer, Fellow of the Royal Society and President of the IEE (now the IET) twice in 1890 and 1896. He invented the three-wire (three-phase) system for the distribution of electrical power, for which he was granted a patent in 1882. He also worked in many areas of electromagnetism and electrostatics, and in 1890 was appointed professor of electrical engineering at King's College London, where he was also director of the Siemens Laboratory.
 
Hopkinson's law, the magnetic counterpart to Ohm's law, is named after him.

Life and career
John Hopkinson was born in Manchester, the eldest of 5 children. His father, also called John, was a mechanical engineer. He was educated at Queenwood School in Hampshire and Owens College in Manchester. He won a scholarship to Trinity College, Cambridge in 1867 and graduated in 1871 as Senior Wrangler, having placed first in the demanding Cambridge Mathematical Tripos examination. During this time he also studied for and passed the examination for a BSc from the University of London. Hopkinson could have followed a purely academic career but instead chose engineering as his vocation. He was a Cambridge Apostle.

After working first in his father's engineering works, Hopkinson took a position in 1872 as an engineering manager in the lighthouse engineering department of Chance Brothers and Company in Smethwick. In 1877 Hopkinson was elected a Fellow of the Royal Society in recognition of his application of Maxwell's theory of electromagnetism to problems of electrostatic capacity and residual charge. In 1878 he moved to London to work as a consulting engineer, focusing particularly on developing his ideas about how to improve the design and efficiency of dynamos. Hopkinson's most important contribution was his three-wire distribution system, patented in 1882. In 1883 Hopkinson showed mathematically that it was possible to connect two alternating current dynamos in parallel-—a problem that had long bedevilled electrical engineers. He also studied magnetic permeability at high temperature, and discovered what was later called the Hopkinson peak effect.

The series-parallel method of electric motor control, for which Hopkinson was granted a British patent in 1881, would prove to be an important advance in the development of electric railways. He applied for a US patent in 1892, triggering an interference proceeding against American inventor Rudolph M Hunter, who had been granted a US patent for the method in 1888. The US Patent Office affirmed Hopkinson's claim to priority of invention, but his British patent expired before the case was resolved, rendering him ineligible for a US patent (his US patent, had one been issued, would have expired concurrently with his British patent).

Hopkinson twice held the office of President of the Institution of Electrical Engineers. During his second term, Hopkinson proposed that the Institution should make available the technical knowledge of electrical engineers for the defence of the country. In 1897 the Volunteer Corps of Electrical Engineers was formed and Hopkinson became major in command of the corps.

Personal life and legacy

On 27 August 1898, Hopkinson and three of his six children, John Gustave, Alice and Lina Evelyn, were killed in a mountaineering accident on the Petite Dent de Veisivi, Val d'Hérens, in the Pennine Alps, Switzerland.

As a memorial to John Hopkinson and his son, the 1899 extension to the Engineering Laboratory in the New Museums Site of the University of Cambridge was named after him. A plaque commemorating this is fixed to the wall in Free School Lane. The Hopkinson and Imperial Chemical Industries Professorship of Applied Thermodynamics is named in his honour.

There is a memorial sundial to Alice Hopkinson in the gardens of Newnham College, Cambridge from which she had recently graduated; the Lina Evelyn Hopkinson Scholarship is awarded to pupils at Wimbledon High School for English Literature.

At the Victoria University of Manchester the Electro-technical Laboratory (1912) in Coupland Street was named after him.

His sons Bertram and Cecil, wife Evelyn and daughter Ellen (married James Alfred Ewing in 1912) are buried in the Ascension Parish Burial Ground, Cambridge; the rest of the family are interred in Switzerland.

See also
 Electric motor
 Three-phase electric power
 Polyphase system
 Rigid collectors
 Bertram Hopkinson, his son
 Alfred Hopkinson and Edward Hopkinson, his younger brothers
 Austin Hopkinson, his nephew

References

Further reading
Hopkinson, Mary & Ewing, Irene, Lady (eds.) (1948) John and Alice Hopkinson 1824-1910. London: Farmer & Sons, printers

External links

 
John Hopkinson
John Hopkinson Biography

1849 births
1898 deaths
Scientists from Manchester
Alumni of Trinity College, Cambridge
Alumni of the University of London
English scientists
Fellows of the Royal Society
English electrical engineers
English physicists
Academics of King's College London
Mountaineering deaths
Sport deaths in Switzerland
Royal Medal winners
Senior Wranglers
John